Dignago is a town in south-central Ivory Coast. It is a sub-prefecture of Gagnoa Department in Gôh Region, Gôh-Djiboua District.

Dignago was a commune until March 2012, when it became one of 1126 communes nationwide that were abolished.

References

Sub-prefectures of Gôh
Former communes of Ivory Coast